The Sanremo trolleybus system or San Remo trolleybus system, also known as the Italian Riviera trolleybus, is focused on the town and comune of Sanremo, in the region of Liguria, northwestern Italy.

History
The trolleybus system on the Italian Riviera was built to replace two interurban tramways, the Taggia–Ospedaletti tramway and the Bordighera–Ventimiglia tramway.  The new trolleybuses, unlike the trams, were also able to cope with the steep climbs between Ospedaletti and Bordighera.

The first trolleybus route, from Sanremo to Ospedaletti (9.15 km), was inaugurated on 21 April 1942, followed on 1 February 1948 by the second line (Sanremo–Taggia), and in 1951 by the Ospedaletti–Ventimiglia extension. The Sanremo–Taggia and Sanremo–Ventimiglia routes were designated as lines T and V, respectively.  A third route, serving the urban area of Sanremo only and using the overhead wires already in place for lines T and V, began operation in 1958, designated line U. Route V is about 18 km long, route T 10 km (originally) and route U 5.75 km.

On 20 December 2001, a  branch was opened on line T to serve the then-new Taggia-Arma railway station.  However, it was used for only a few months. In March 2002, line T service was converted indefinitely to motorbuses, due to roadworks, and a succession of other road projects have continued to delay the reinstatement of trolleybus service.  At present, trolleybuses have not operated on line T since 2002.

The trolleybus system was owned and operated by La Società Trasporti Elettrici Liguri (STEL) until 1983, when Riviera Trasporti SpA took over.

Routes

Two services are operated along the single corridor comprising the Sanremo trolleybus system.  They are:

 U Sanremo urban service (La Brezza ↔ Villa Helios)
 V Sanremo (bus station) ↔ Ventimiglia (Piazza Costituente)

Former route
Also situated in the same coastal corridor, but no longer trolleybus-operated:
 T Sanremo (bus station) ↔ Taggia (railway station)

See also

Sanremo railway station
List of trolleybus systems in Italy

References

External links

 Profilo e storia della Riviera Trasporti (Profile and history of Riviera Trasporti). Riviera Trasporti. 
 Images of the Italian Riviera trolleybus system, at photorail.com
 Images of the Italian Riviera trolleybus system, at railfaneurope.net
 http://ymtram.mashke.org/italy/san_remo/ A detailed website on Ventimiglia - San Remo - Taggia Interurban Trolleybus and (former) Tram Network

This article is based partially upon a translation of the Italian language version as at March 2011.

Sanremo
Sanremo
Sanremo
Transport in Liguria
1942 establishments in Italy